Pat Finley (born October 14, 1940) is an American stage and television actress. She was also credited as Patte Finley in From a Bird's Eye View, The Mary Tyler Moore Show, and Perry Mason.

She was the daughter of Robert Finley, a Washington state supreme court judge, and his wife Werdna, a philanthropist and promoter of children's theater. She grew up in the Pacific Northwest with her siblings Mary Ellen "Sparkle" and younger brother Randy Finley, who would go on to operate a chain of movie theaters in the Pacific Northwest.

Beginning in the early 1960s Finley worked in off-Broadway stage musicals, including Bye Bye Birdie and Greenwich Village, U.S.A. For a time she was managed by Wally Amos, future cookie entrepreneur, then of the William Morris Agency.

During the 1970s Finley had recurring roles on a number of TV shows, including on the short-lived The Funny Side, The Bob Newhart Show (in 15 episodes, as Bob's sister Ellen, who becomes romantically involved with neighbor Howard, portrayed by Bill Daily), and The Rockford Files (in 6 episodes, as the wife of Dennis Becker, portrayed by Joe Santos). She reprised her role on The Rockford Files in the 1996 television film Godfather Knows Best.

In 1990 Finley became a co-host of Seattle Today, a local daytime television show.

Since the 1980s she has divided her time between Seattle and Annecy, France.

References

External links

1940 births
Living people
American stage actresses
American television actresses
20th-century American actresses
21st-century American women